The Little River flows into the Grass River in Canton, New York.

References 

Rivers of St. Lawrence County, New York